Driving Rain is the twelfth studio album by English musician Paul McCartney, released on 12 November 2001 as a double LP, a single cassette, and single CD.

Background
Following the example of Run Devil Run brisk production schedule, Driving Rain – except for two songs – was cut with David Kahne producing in two weeks, starting in February 2001. McCartney used musicians who were scheduled to back him on tour.

Album cover
The cover of the album features a photograph taken with a Casio wristwatch containing a built-in camera.

Music and lyrics
"Back in the Sunshine Again" was co-written by McCartney and his son James. On 11 September 2001, McCartney was sitting on a plane in New York City when the terrorist attacks occurred, and was able to witness the events from his seat. Incensed at the tragedy and determined to respond, he composed "Freedom" and helped organise The Concert for New York City, a large all-star show at Madison Square Garden on 20 October.

The songs "About You"  and "Heather" were written for Heather Mills, as thanks for helping McCartney grieve the death of his first wife, Linda.

Release and reception

In November 2001, Driving Rain was released to generally strong reviews but stunned many with its very low sales. The album sold 66,000 copies in its first week in the US. Driving Rain peaked at number 46 in the UK, and became McCartney's lowest-selling album in his homeland. The US reaction was a little stronger, with the album peaking at number 26 and being certified Gold by the RIAA.

McCartney halted the pressing of Driving Rain so that "Freedom" could appear as a hidden track (since the artwork had already been printed). The just-released "From a Lover to a Friend" (which only reached number 45 in the UK) was repackaged with "Freedom", although the single failed to re-chart.

Reviewing the album for Uncut magazine, Ian MacDonald commented on McCartney's spontaneous approach to its recording, saying that "In parts (for example, the lengthy closer 'Rinse The Raindrops'), the results are almost ferocious, coming as close to a McCartney-esque Tin Machine as one could reasonably imagine." MacDonald considered the more "polished and produced" tracks to be "the most successful", however, and concluded: "Possibly a grower, this album is certainly better than anything Macca's done for some while, if not the late masterpiece some of us have been hoping for." Fox News commentator Roger Friedman remarked that the chorus of the song "Tiny Bubble" is "remarkably" similar to "Piggies", written by George Harrison and released on the Beatles' 1968 self-titled double album (also known as the "White Album"). In a 2022 retrospective,  Far Out Magazine hailed "Heather" as a "bouncy piano piece" that doubled as a tribute to his marriage and his compositional gift. 

McCartney opened his tour in support of the album in April 2002. Titled the Driving USA tour, it was a commercial success, with extensions being added to the itinerary around the world.

Track listing
All songs by Paul McCartney, except "Spinning on an Axis" and "Back in the Sunshine Again" co-written by James McCartney.

"Lonely Road" – 3:16
"From a Lover to a Friend" – 3:48
"She's Given Up Talking" – 4:57
"Driving Rain" – 3:26
"I Do" – 2:56
"Tiny Bubble" – 4:21
"Magic" – 3:59
"Your Way" – 2:55
"Spinning on an Axis" – 5:16
"About You" – 2:54
"Heather" – 3:26
"Back in the Sunshine Again" – 4:21
"Your Loving Flame" – 3:43
"Riding into Jaipur" – 4:08
"Rinse the Raindrops" – 10:08
"Freedom" (studio mix) – 3:34
 Due to the last minute addition of "Freedom", it was not listed in the track list and thus appears as a hidden track. "Freedom" was recorded live during The Concert for New York City with later studio overdubs. There are some copies of the CD that were issued with an outerbox and a different cover and the track listings featured "Freedom" as an official track.

iTunes exclusive track
"From a Lover to a Friend"  – 5:26
 In 2007, upon adding McCartney's catalogue of music, the iTunes Store added one of David Kahne's two remixes of the song "From a Lover to a Friend" as an exclusive bonus track. This remix is the version released on CD-singles for this song and "Freedom".

Personnel
Personnel per booklet.

Musicians
 Paul McCartney – bass guitar, acoustic guitar, electric guitar, classical guitar, vocals, Ludwig drums, Fender Rhodes electric piano, knee slaps, percussion, piano
 Abe Laboriel Jr. – drums, tambourine, Roland electronic percussion, Ludwig drums, DW drums, electronic drums, backing vocals, African drum samples, accordion
 Rusty Anderson – electric guitar, pedal steel guitar, acoustic guitar, 12-string electric guitar, Vox bass guitar, backing vocals, percussion, tampura
 Gabe Dixon – Wurlitzer electric piano, piano, Hammond organ, Fender Rhodes, backing vocals
 David Kahne – Roland organ, electric guitar, synths, orchestral samples, Wurlitzer, sampled strings
 James McCartney – percussion, electric guitar
 Ralph Morrison – violin
 String quartet:
 David Campbell – viola
 Matt Funes – viola
 Joel Derouin – violin
 Larry Corbett – cello
 Eric Clapton – guitar on track 16

Production
 David Leonard – mixing
 David Kahne – producer
 Paul McCartney – executive producer
 Mark Dearnley – engineer
 Jaime Sickora – assistant engineer
 Kevin Mills – 2nd assistant engineer
 Geoff Emerick, Paul Hicks – additional engineers
 Mark Dearnley, David Kahne – mixing
 Stephen Marcussen – mastering
 Stewart Whitmore – digital editing
 Norman Hathaway with Micha Weidmann, Donat Raetzo – design
 Paul McCartney, Heather Mills – photos

Charts and certifications

Weekly charts

Certifications and sales

References

External links

JPGR's Beatles site: Paul McCartney's Driving Rain

2001 albums
Paul McCartney albums
Parlophone albums
Albums produced by David Kahne
Albums recorded at A&M Studios